Anna Tatishvili was the defending champion, but she lost to Julia Boserup in the quarterfinals.

Michaëlla Krajicek came through qualifying and won the tournament, defeating Naomi Broady in the final, 6–7(2–7), 7–6(7–3), 7–5.

Seeds

Main draw

Finals

Top half

Bottom half

References 
 Main draw

Coleman Vision Tennis Championships - Singles